Zed Radio "The Online Party Station" was a very popular online Dance Hits web radio station based in Zaporizhia, Ukraine.  It was founded in June 2003 and operated only a few hours per week.

In June 2004, after a legal dispute over an American group of broadcasters bringing the Europa Plus network to the USA, the American broadcasters joined up with Zed Radio and turned the station into a full-time Dance Hits/Chill Out format. Zed Radio now had a new studio in the USA. Zed Radio produced a very popular metal show Mandatory Metal hosted by DJ Zombie, which can now be heard on Surge Radio.

In September 2004, the Ukraine-based Zed Radio was threatened with lawsuits for rebroadcasting shows Garage, EuroMix, and Euro-Hit Top 40 from Europa Plus without permission. Later, Zed Radio refocused its format, leaning more to a Hot AC format. The USA Department built another studio in Antelope Valley, and the Ukraine Department rented a professional radio studio from TRK Grani.

In November 2004, Zed Radio joined forces with Dimension's DJing and DJ CM3 became the new music director. DJ CM3 flipped the station to a Dance/Hip Hop format, going against the wishes of General Manager Yegor Veklich.

In March 2005, the General Manager dismissed the USA Department from Zed Radio's operations. The two departments went their separate ways: the Ukraine Department became Dance Hits Radio Galaktika while the USA Department became Dance/Hip Hop Surge Radio.

WDOS-FM picked up Zed Radio's unique dance format on their Friday and Saturday Night Dance Parties.

Surge Radio
Surge Radio officially opened on April 22, 2005 after renovating the studio. They possessed control of the streaming servers used by Zed Radio, while the newly formed Radio Galaktika was left dead in the water. Surge Radio originally opened with a Dance/Hip Hop format but later flipped to Underground Punk, Metal and Electronica after the exit of Music Director DJ CM3.

Radio Galaktika
Within a week after Surge Radio opened, Radio Galaktika made a business agreement with Surge Radio in which they could lease server capacity in exchange for producing their jingles and IDs. They were not in operation 24 hours, and there had been intervals of several months without any broadcasting. Radio Galaktika supposedly held a license for 99.9 FM in Zaporizhia, Ukraine, but now have pulled out of business{fact}.

Zed Radio's Original Staff
Angela Browne - Air Personality (The Really Really Awesome Friday Show)
DJ CM3 - Music Director
DJ Pronto - Assistant Program/Traffic Director
DJ Howie - Assistant Music Director + Air Personality (Howie's Mixtape)
Duane Segovia - Sound Technician
James Fourr - Computer Technician
Kaylyn Kolesar - Air Personality (The Really Really Awesome Friday Show)
DJ Smog - Air Personality (Smog's Weekend Liftoff)
Dima Vasilev - Assistant General Manager + Air Personality
 Yegor Veklich - General Manager + Air Personality
DJ Whammy - Program/Traffic Director + Air Personality (Overdrive)
DJ Zombie - Air Personality (Mandatory Metal)

Radio stations in Ukraine
Internet radio stations
Defunct radio stations
Mass media in Zaporizhzhia
Defunct mass media in Ukraine